This article deals with Japanese equivalents of English adjectives.

Types of adjective
In Japanese, nouns and verbs can modify nouns, with nouns taking the 〜の particles when functioning attributively (in the genitive case), and verbs in the attributive form (連体形 ). These are considered separate classes of words, however.

Most of the words that can be considered to be adjectives in Japanese fall into one of two categories – variants of verbs, and nouns:

adjectival verb (Japanese: 形容詞, literally 形容 "description" or "appearance" + 詞 "word"), or i-adjectives
These can be considered specialized verbs, in that they inflect for various aspects such as past tense or negation, and they can be used predicatively to end a sentence, without the need for any other "to be" verb. For example,  (暑い) "hot":
暑い日 ("a hot day")
今日は暑い。(.) ("Today is hot.")
adjectival noun (形容動詞, literally 形容 "description" or "appearance" + 動詞 "verb"), or na-adjectives
These can be considered a form of noun in terms of syntax; these attach to the copula, which then inflects, but use 〜な -na (rather than the genitive 〜の) when modifying a noun. For example,  (変) "strange":
変な人 ("a strange person")
彼は変だ。(.) ("He is strange.")
Both the predicative forms (終止形 , also called the "conclusive form" or "terminal form") and attributive forms (連体形 ) of adjectival verbs and adjectival nouns can be analyzed as verb phrases, making the attributive forms of adjectival verbs and adjectival nouns relative clauses, rather than adjectives. According to this analysis, Japanese has no syntactic adjectives.

Japanese adjectives that do not fall into either of these categories are usually grouped into a grab-bag category:
attributives (連体詞, literally 連 "connects, goes with" + 体 "body", short for 体言 "uninflecting word" such as a noun + 詞 "word")
These may only occur before nouns, and not in a predicative position. They are various in derivation and word class, and are generally analyzed as variants of more basic classes, where this specific form (possibly a fossil) can only be used in restricted settings. For example,  (大きな) "big" (variant of 大きい):
大きな事 ("a big thing")

A couple of small sub-categories can be distinguished in these categories, reflecting former grammatical distinctions or constructions which no longer exist:
-shii adjectives (form of -i adjectives, see below)
-yaka na adjectives (see below)
-raka na adjectives (see below)
taru adjectives (ト・タル形容動詞, literally "to, taru adjectival noun")
These are a variant of the common na-nominals (adjectival noun; see article for naming) that developed in Late Old Japanese and have mostly died out, surviving in a few cases as fossils; they are usually classed as a form of 形容動詞 (adjectival noun), as the Japanese name indicates.
naru adjectives
These are words that were traditionally earlier forms of na-nominals, but that followed a path similar to taru adjectives, surviving in a few cases as fossils. These are generally classed as rentaishi.

Syntax

i-adjectives
Adjectival verbs (形容詞 ) end with い i (but never えい ei) in base form. They may predicate sentences and inflect for past, negative, etc. As they head verb phrases, they can be considered a type of verbal (verb-like part of speech) and inflect in an identical manner as the negative form of verbs. Their inflections are different and not so numerous as full verbs.

Adjectival verbs are considered verbs because they inflect with the same bases as verbs and their respective usages: irrealis (未然形 ), continuative (連用形 ), terminal (終止形 ), attributive (連体形 ), hypothetical (仮定形 ), and imperative (命令形 ).

Among the six bases of verbs for adjectival verbs, there exist two sets of inflection paradigms: a "plain" or "true" conjugation, and what is known as a kari-conjugation (カリ活用 ), which is the result of the contraction between the "plain"  form 〜く  and the verb あり (有り, 在り) , meaning "to exist", "to have", or "to be".

The stem of i-adjectives can combine (prepend on the left), similar to the stem form (連用形 ) of verbs, though this is less common than for verbs. Conversely, nouns or verb stems can sometimes prepend i-adjectives, or two i-adjectives can combine, forming compound modifiers; these are much less common than Japanese compound verbs.

shii-adjectives

However, they merged over the course of Late Middle Japanese (see Late Middle Japanese adjectives), and now shii-adjectives are simply a form of i-adjectives.

na-adjectives
Adjectival nouns (形容動詞 keiyō-dōshi) always occur with a form of the copula, traditionally considered part of the adjectival noun itself. The only syntactical difference between nouns and adjectival nouns is in the attributive form, where nouns take no and adjectives take na. This has led many linguists to consider them a type of nominal (noun-like part of speech). Through use of inflected forms of the copula, these words can also predicate sentences and inflect for past, negative, etc.

Notably, na adjectives are distinct from regular nouns, in that they cannot be used as the topic, subject, or object.  To function in these roles, the na adjectives must include the nominalizing suffix , broadly similar to the English suffix -ness that is used to create nouns from adjectives.

-yaka na adjectives 
There are a number of na adjectives ending in 〜やか -yaka, particularly for subjective words (compare -i adjectives ending in -shii). This is believed to be a combination of two suffixes 〜や -ya and 〜か -ka, where -ya meant "softness" and -ka meant "apparent, visible" (similar to modern 〜そう -sō, which is also followed by 〜な), hence the combination -ya-ka meant "appears somewhat ..., looks slightly ...". This was believed to have been used in the Nara era, and have become particularly popular in the Heian period, but is no longer productive. In some cases the original word is now only used (or almost always used) in the -yaka form, such as 鮮やか aza-yaka "vivid, brilliant", 穏やか oda-yaka "calm, gentle", and 爽やか sawa-yaka "fresh, clear", while in other cases the word is used in isolation, such as 雅 miyabi "elegant, graceful", which is used alongside 雅やか miyabi-yaka "elegant, graceful", and in other cases a related word also exists, such as 賑やか nigi-yaka "bustling, busy" and the verb 賑わう nigi-wau "be bustling, be busy". The most basic of these is 賑やか nigi-yaka "bustling, busy", but many of these are everyday words. Due to the -yaka being originally a suffix, it is written as okurigana, even though the compound word may now be a fixed unit.

-raka na adjectives 
Similarly, there are also a few na adjectives ending in 〜らか -raka, of similar origin. These are generally less subjective, but declined in popularity relative to the -yaka construction in the Heian period Notable examples include 明らか aki-raka "clear, obvious" and 柔らか／軟らか yawa-raka "soft, gentle". As with -yaka words, the 〜らか is written out as okurigana.

taru-adjectives 
A variant of na adjectives exist, which take 〜たる -taru when functioning attributively (as an adjective, modifying a noun), and 〜と -to when functioning adverbially (when modifying a verb), instead of the 〜な -na and 〜に -ni which are mostly used with na adjectives. taru adjectives do not predicate a sentence (they cannot end a sentence, as verbs and i-adjectives can) or take the copula (as na-adjectives and nouns can), but must modify a noun or verb. Note that sometimes na adjectives take a 〜と, and Japanese sound symbolisms generally take a (sometimes optional) 〜と, though these are different word classes.

There are very few of these words, and they usually are considered somewhat stiff or archaic; this word class is generally not covered in textbooks for foreign language learners of Japanese. One of the most common is 堂々 dōdō "magnificent, stately". These are referred to in Japanese as ト・タル形容動詞 (to, taru keiyōdōshi) or タルト型活用 (taruto-kata katsuyō – “taru, to form conjugation”).

See 形容動詞#「タルト」型活用 for discussion in Japanese. Historically, these developed in Late Old Japanese as a variant of na adjectives, but the form mostly died out; the remaining taru adjectives are fossils, and conjugationally defective, having formerly held the pattern of the r-irregular class, like its component あり.

naru-adjectives 
There are also a few  adjectives such as 単なる  "mere, simple" or 聖なる seinaru "holy", which developed similarly to taru-adjectives. In Late Old Japanese, tari adjectives developed as a variant of nari adjectives. Most nari adjectives became na adjectives in Modern Japanese, while tari adjectives either died out or survived as taru adjective fossils, but a few nari adjectives followed a similar path to the tari adjectives and became naru adjective fossils. They are generally classed into rentaishi.

Attributives
Attributives are few in number, and unlike the other words, are strictly limited to modifying nouns.  never predicate sentences. They derive from other word classes, and so are not always given the same treatment syntactically. The final form , which occurs with the copula, is usually considered to be a noun, albeit one derived from the adjectival verb.

It can be seen that attributives are analysed variously as nouns, verbs, or adjectival nouns.

Archaic forms

Inflection

i-adjective
Adjectival verbs (i-adjectives) have a basic inflection created by dropping the -i from the end and replacing it with the appropriate ending. Adjectival verbs are made more polite by the use of です desu. です desu is added directly after the inflected plain form and has no syntactic function; its only purpose is to make the utterance more polite (see Honorific speech in Japanese).

いい ii "good" is a special case because it comes from the adjective 良い yoi. In present tense it is read as いい ii but since it derives from よい yoi all of its inflections supplete its forms instead. For example, 良いですね ii desu ne "[It] is good" becomes 良かったですね yokatta desu ne "[It] was good". かっこいい kakkoii "cool" also fits the same category because it is a mash-up of 格好 kakkō and いい ii.

い i adjectives like 安い i ("cheap") have the い i changed to ければ  to change them to conditional form, e.g. 安ければ ; 安くなければ .

Adjectival verbs do actually have a full verb inflection paradigm created through contraction with the former copular verb あり (ari), consisting of six verb bases, that obeys the grammar surrounding verbs in Japanese. The usage of the full inflection is more limited in Modern Japanese and the majority of adjective usage in Japanese will be within the bounds of the basic inflection above. Auxiliary verbs are attached to some of the verb bases in order to convey information; only the terminal, attributive, and imperative bases are used on their own without auxiliary support.

The two irrealis stems, 〜かろ  and 〜から , are used for different purposes. The 〜かろ  stem is used to create the volitional inflection by appending the volitional auxiliary 〜う , e.g. 暑かろう , while the 〜から  stem is used for the formal negation auxiliary 〜ず  and all other purposes which require the irrealis stem, e.g. 暑からず .

The volitional form is generally used to convey supposition or presumption; there are also set phrases which utilize this form, a notable example being the volitional form of 良い yoi, 良かろう yokarō, a formal or archaic expression for "very well" or "it would be best to..." and the volitional form of 無い nai, 無かろう nakarō, a formal or archaic expression for "probably not so".

The imperative form is rarely used outside of set expressions; a common usage is once again with 良い yoi, and its imperative form 良かれ yokare, in idiomatic set expressions like 良かれと思う yokare to omou (to wish for the best, to have good intentions) or 良かれ悪しかれ yokare-ashikare (good or bad, for better or for worse, be it good or bad), also making use of the imperative form of 悪しい ashii (formerly the regular word for "bad", since replaced by 悪い warui). The imperative form of 無い nai, 無かれ nakare, is also used in archaic speech to indicate prohibition or a command not to do something or to indicate that one must not do something (also spelled 勿れ, 毋れ, 莫れ).

na-adjective
Adjectival nouns (na-adjectives) have a basic inflection created by dropping the -na and replacing it with the appropriate form of the verb da, the copula. As with adjectival verbs, adjectival nouns are also made more polite by the use of です . です  is used in its role as the polite form of the copula, therefore replacing da (the plain form of the copula) in the plain form of these adjectives.

な na adjectives have なら nara added to them to change to conditional form, and just like all other ない nai form inflections, behave like an い i adjective when in negative form, e.g. 簡単じゃなければ k.

Because na-adjectives are simply suffixed with the copula da, they, too, like i-adjectives, have a full verb inflection paradigm with six bases that obeys the grammar surrounding Japanese verbs.

Similarly to i-adjectives, out of the multiple irrealis stems, the 〜だろ daro irrealis stem is only used with the volitional auxiliary suffix 〜う u, to form the volitional form suffixed with volitional copula 〜だろう darō, used primarily to present a supposition or presumption. The 〜では dewa irrealis stem is not considered a true irrealis stem because it is simply the continuative stem plus the case particle は wa, but is nevertheless suffixied with standard negation auxiliary 〜ない nai to form the negative form (see the basic inflection above). The 〜なら nara irrealis stem is used with the formal negation auxiliary 〜ず zu and all other uses of the irrealis stem.

The 〜なる attributive form exists as a fossil from the archaic ナリ活用 (nari katsuyō), or nari-conjugation, the precursor to the modern na-adjective. Generally only the 〜な na form is used for attribution, but the 〜なる form may be used to add a sense of stress, intensity, profundity, formality, or an imitation of archaic speech, such as 人類の偉大なる遺産 jinrui no idai-naru isan, "the great legacy of humanity", as compared to 人類の偉大な遺産 jinrui no idai-na isan. It may also be seen in set phrases, like in 親愛なる shin'ai-naru, used to open and address a letter to someone, much like English dear.

The 〜なる attributive form is also used in naru-adjectives, like 単なる tan-naru or 聖なる sei-naru. In almost all cases, these are used exclusively as pre-noun attributives and cannot be used in any of the other standard forms of na-adjectives. In Modern Japanese, they only serve to modify nouns and cannot be used terminally nor even adverbially, as a contrast with the similar taru-adjectives. It is generally considered ungrammatical or unnatural to use other forms with naru-adjectives, even if technically syntactically correct.

taru-adjective
taru-adjectives have much more limited usage in Modern Japanese and generally can only be used attributively with 〜たる taru or adverbially with 〜と to. Generally, to express past or negative forms, additional other words or syntax are added to the sentence rather than using the full verb paradigm. However, nevertheless, taru-adjectives do have a full verb paradigm with six bases that obeys the grammar surrounding verbs in Japanese, which may be used in archaic or highly formal speech.

The terminal form 〜たり tari is almost never used. Generic words like 物 mono, 事 koto, 人 hito, and 方 kata are used as fill-ins with the attributive form instead.

Adverb forms
Both adjectival verbs and adjectival nouns can form adverbs. In the case of adjectival verbs, い i changes to く ku:
atsuku naru "become hot"
and in the case of adjectival nouns, な na changes to に ni:
hen ni naru "become strange"
There are also some words like たくさん takusan and 全然 zenzen that are adverbs in their root form:
全然分かりません zenzen wakarimasen "[I] absolutely not understand."

In a few cases, a 〜に form of a word is common while a 〜な form is rare or non-existent, as in  –  is common, but  is generally not used.

Terminology

The Japanese word keiyōshi is used to denote an English adjective.

Because the widespread study of Japanese is still relatively new in the Western world, there are no generally accepted English translations for the above parts of speech, with varying texts adopting different sets, and others extant not listed above.

See also
 Japanese verb conjugation
 Japanese godan and ichidan verbs
 Japanese grammar

Notes

References

External links
 Why does Japanese have two kinds of adjectives? (-i adjectives and -na adjectives), Boaz Yaniv, 2011 Jun 13, Japanese Language & Usage, Stack Exchange

Adjectives
Adjectives by language